Gorenje Lakovnice is a settlement in the hills south of Novo Mesto in southeastern Slovenia. It includes the small hamlet of Cerovec. The area is part of the traditional region of Lower Carniola and is now included in the Southeast Slovenia Statistical Region.

The local church in Cerovec is dedicated to Saint Florian and belongs to the Parish of Novo Mesto–Šmihel. It was built in the late 16th century.

References

External links
Gorenje Lakovnice on Geopedia

Populated places in the City Municipality of Novo Mesto